Paesia scaberula, the ring fern or , is a lacy, creeping New Zealand fern that grows up to  with yellow-green fronds, brown stalks and a distinctive smell.

Distribution
This fern can be found throughout the North and South Islands, Stewart Island and the Chatham Islands.

References

Dennstaedtiaceae
Ferns of New Zealand
Plants described in 1832